Ixtlahuacán is a municipality in the Mexican state of Colima. 
The municipal seat lies at Ixtlahuacán. The municipality covers an area of 468.7 km².

As of 2005, the municipality had a total population of 2,484.

Its residents are called Ixtlahuaqueños. It is one of the most remote municipios of the state.  It is located between Tecoman and the city of Colima

Climate

References

Municipalities of Colima

es:Ixtlahuacán
nl:Ixtlahuacán (Colima)